Crepidodera nigricoxis is a species of flea beetle from the Chrysomelidae family that can be found in Albania, Austria, Bulgaria, Greece, North Macedonia, Romania, Slovakia, Yugoslavia, and Near East.

References

Beetles described in 1878
Beetles of Europe
Alticini